David Ratcliff (born 1970 in Los Angeles) is a painter based in Los Angeles. His work involves spray painting on collages using appropriated images.

Early life and education
He was born in Los Angeles, California in 1970.  Ratcliff studied at the Pratt Institute in New York and attained a BFA in 1992.

Career
His early work has been described as spray-painted stencils fighting for space on the canvas; this evolved into his more recent work as more complex and abstract.  Ratcliff's work has been shown at prominent commercial galleries such as Mary Boone Gallery in New York, and Peres Projects in Berlin, and was included in the USA Today exhibition at the Royal Academy in London. His work is featured in several important collections including the Saatchi Gallery, Frank Cohen Museum of Contemporary Art  in Manchester (UK), and the Los Angeles County Museum of Art. He is represented by Team Gallery in New York and Maureen Paley in London. His artwork has been sold at Phillips de Pury & Company and Sotheby's.

Exhibitions

Solo exhibitions

2011
Portraits, Team Gallery, New York, NY
2010 	
Ghost Paintings, Galerie Rodolphe Janssen, Brussels, Belgium
Bsckground, Honor Fraser Gallery, Los Angeles, CA
2009 	
Maureen Paley, London, England
2008 
Defect's Mirror, Team Gallery, New York, NY
2007 	
Tomio Koyama Gallery, Tokyo, Japan
Cosmetic Surgery, Team Gallery, New York, NY
Bob Loblaw, Galerie Rodolphe Janssen, Brussels, Belgium
2005
LISTE, Basel, Switzerland (under the auspices of Team Gallery, New York

Group exhibitions
2011
The shortest distance between 2 points is often intolerable, curated by Andrew Berardini, Brand New Gallery, Milan, Italy
2010 	
Tomio Koyama Gallery, Tokyo, Japan
David Ratcliff, Noriko Furunishi, Tomio Koyama Gallery, Kyoto, Japan
2009 	
The Night Goat Demands Reparations, curated by Adam Miller, Art Center College of Design, Pasadena, California	
Cave #1, curated by Bob Nickas, Gresham's Ghost, New York, NY
Light Motive, Galerie Suzanne Tarasiéve, Paris, France
Dark Summer, Galerie Rodolphe Janssen, Brussels, Belgium
2008 	
History Keeps Me Awake at Night: A Genealogy of Wojnarowicz, PPOW, New York, NY
That was then... This is now PS1, New York, NY
The Hidden Maureen Paley, London, England
2007 	
Post-Rose: Artists in and out of the Hazard Park Complex, curated by Sterling Ruby, Galerie Christian Nagel, Berlin
Painting as Fact, Fact as Fiction, curated by Bob Nickas, de Pury & Luxembourg, Zurich, Switzerland
2006 	
The Gold Standard, curated by Bob Nickas and Walead Beshty, PS1, New York, NY
The Monty Hall Problem, curated by Slater Bradley, Blum & Poe, Los Angeles, CA
LAXed: New Painting from L.A., Peres Projects, Berlin, Germany
Loveless, Team Gallery, New York, NY
I Love My Scene: Scene Two, curated by José Freire, Mary Boone Gallery, New York, NY
2005 	
The Pantagruel Syndrome, curated by Francesco Bonami and Carolyn Christov-Bakargiev, Turin Triennial, Turin, Italy
5 X U, Team Gallery, New York, NY

Public collections
Frank Cohen MOCA Manchester, UK
Los Angeles County Museum of Art, CA, USA
Jumex Collection, Mexico City
Saatchi Collection, London, UK

Personal life
He has a daughter.

See also

Team Gallery
Maureen Paley

References

External links
Saatchi Gallery

1970 births
Living people
20th-century American painters
20th-century American male artists
American male painters
21st-century American painters
21st-century American male artists
Pratt Institute alumni